Jhon Darwin Atapuma Hurtado (born 15 January 1988) is a Colombian cyclist, who currently rides for Colombian amateur team .

In 2015, he finished 16th in the Giro d'Italia and 56th in the Vuelta a España. In the 2016 Vuelta a España, he held the red jersey after a second-place finish in Stage 4. In September 2016 Atapuma announced that he would join  on a two-year deal from 2017.

Major results

2007
 6th Overall Vuelta al Ecuador
1st Stages 2 & 8
2008
 1st  Road race, National Road Championships
2009
 3rd Overall Tour de Beauce
1st Stage 3
 6th Overall Coupe des nations Ville Saguenay
2010
 6th Overall Vuelta a Colombia
 8th Overall Grand Prix du Portugal
 9th Overall Tour de l'Avenir
2011
 9th Overall Tour de l'Ain
2012
 3rd Road race, National Road Championships
 8th Overall Giro del Trentino
1st Stage 4
 9th Overall Volta a Portugal
 10th Overall Vuelta a Colombia
 10th Overall Monviso-Venezia — Il Padania
2013
 1st Stage 6 Tour de Pologne
 6th Overall Tour of Slovenia
 6th Overall Tour of Turkey
2014
 9th Overall Tour de San Luis
2015
 1st Stage 1 (TTT) Vuelta a España
 7th Overall Volta a Catalunya
2016
 1st Stage 5 Tour de Suisse
 4th Overall Tour of Utah
 9th Overall Giro d'Italia
 Vuelta a España
Held  &  after Stages 4–7
2017
 4th Road race, National Road Championships
  Combativity award Stage 18 Tour de France
2019
 10th Mont Ventoux Dénivelé Challenge
2021
 1st Stage 8 Vuelta a Colombia

Grand Tour general classification results timeline

References

External links

Darwin Atapuma at bmcracingteam.com
ATAPUMA HURTADO Jhon Darwin at cqranking.com

Colombian male cyclists
Living people
1988 births
Sportspeople from Nariño Department
Tour de Suisse stage winners